Konstantin Hierl (24 February 1875 – 23 September 1955) was a major figure in the administration of Nazi Germany. He was the head of the Reich Labour Service (Reichsarbeitsdienst; RAD) a Reichsleiter of the Nazi Party and an associate of Adolf Hitler before he came to national power.

Life
Hierl was born in Parsberg near Neumarkt in the Bavarian Upper Palatinate region, and attended secondary school (Gymnasium) in Burghausen and Regensburg. In 1893 he joined the Bavarian Army as a cadet. He obtained the rank of Leutnant in 1895 and graduated from the military academy in 1902. He was promoted to Hauptmann in 1909. He served as a company commander in the Bavarian infantry. In World War I Hierl served as a member of the general staff of the I Royal Bavarian Reserve Corps, part of the German 6th Army fighting on the Western Front, where he achieved the rank of Oberstleutnant and was awarded the Iron Cross, 1st and 2nd class and other decorations.

Upon the German defeat and the November Revolution of 1918, Hierl became head of a paramilitary Freikorps unit. Hierl played a role in organizing the Black Reichswehr paramilitary forces in the early years of the Weimar Republic. He was discharged from the service with the rank of Oberst in September 1924, in part due to his support of General Erich Ludendorff's participation in the Beer Hall Putsch. In 1925, he joined Ludendorff's far-right Tannenbergbund political society, which Hierl left two years later.

Nazi Party
In April 1929 he joined the Nazi Party (NSDAP) and became head of Organization Department II that same year, serving as Deputy to Gregor Strasser. In the federal election of 1930, he became a member of the Reichstag parliament. On 5 June 1931, two years before the Nazi Party ascended to national power, Hierl became head of the FAD (Freiwilliger Arbeitsdienst), a state sponsored voluntary labour organization that provided services to civic and agricultural construction projects. There were many such organizations in Europe at the time, founded to provide much-needed employment during the Great Depression. 

Hierl was already a high-ranking member of the NSDAP when the Party took power in January 1933. He remained the head of the labour organization - now called the Nationalsozialistischer Arbeitsdienst, or NSAD. Adolf Hitler named him as State Secretary in the Reich Ministry of Labour under Franz Seldte, with the order to build up a powerful labour service organization. Facing Minister Seldte's resistance, Hierl in 1934 switched to the Reich Ministry of the Interior under Wilhelm Frick in the rank of a Reichskommissar. Hierl was also named a member of Hans Frank's Academy for German Law. On 11 July 1934, the NSAD was renamed Reichsarbeitsdienst or RAD (Reich Labor Service) which Hierl would control as its chief until the end of World War II. The Reich Labor Service was divided into two major sections, one for men (Reichsarbeitsdienst Männer - RAD/M) and one for women (Reichsarbeitdienst der weiblichen Jugend - RAD/wJ). The RAD was composed of 40 Gau-sections (Arbeitsgau). In 1936 the Reich Labor Service built the model village of Hierlshagen (present-day Ostaszów in Poland), named after Hierl. He was named Reich Labor Leader (Reichsarbeitsführer) in 1935 and Reichsleiter, the second highest political rank in the Nazi Party, on 10 September 1936. Also in 1936, he was awarded the Golden Party Badge. Hierl was further appointed Minister Without Portfolio in 1943.

During World War II, hundreds of RAD units were engaged in supplying frontline troops with food, ammunition, repairing damaged roads and constructing and repairing airstrips. RAD units constructed coastal fortifications (many RAD men worked on the Atlantic Wall), laid minefields, manned fortifications, and even helped guard vital locations and POW camps. The role of the Reich Labor Service was not limited to combat support functions. Hundreds of RAD units received training as anti-aircraft units and were deployed as Flak batteries.

On 24 February 1945, Hierl was awarded the German Order, the highest decoration the Nazi Party could bestow on an individual. After the war, he was tried and found guilty of "major offenses". Hierl was sentenced to five years in a labour camp. Following his early release, he lived in Heidelberg until his death on 23 September 1955.

Decorations

German Order with Oak Leaves and Swords: February 24, 1945
Prussian House Order of Hohenzollern, Knight's Cross (WWI)
Prussian Iron Cross 1st and 2nd Class (WWI)
Bavarian Military Merit Order, 3rd Class with Swords (WWI)
Bavarian Prince Regent Luitpold Medal (pre-WWI)
Bavarian Service Cross (pre-WWI)
Austrian-Hungarian Military Merit Cross, 3rd Class with War Decoration (WWI)
The Honour Cross of the World War 1914/1918 (pre-WWII)
War Merit Cross 1st and 2nd Class with Swords (WWII)
Golden Party Badge (pre-WWII)

Notes

References

External links
 Konstantin Hierl in Deutsche Biographie
 

1875 births
1955 deaths
Members of the Academy for German Law
Members of the Reichstag of the Weimar Republic
Members of the Reichstag of Nazi Germany
Nazi Germany ministers
Nazi Party officials
People from Neumarkt (district)
Recipients of the German Order (decoration)
Recipients of the Iron Cross (1914), 1st class
Recipients of the Iron Cross (1914), 2nd class
Reichsleiters
20th-century Freikorps personnel
20th-century German criminals
German Army personnel of World War I